Afroedura tirasensis , also known as African rock gecko, is a species of African geckos endemic to Namibia. It was originally described as a subspecies of Afroedura africana.

References

tirasensis
Reptiles described in 1965
Reptiles of Namibia
Endemic fauna of Namibia